The Millennium Tower and Cultural Centre project is one of a number of projects in the Central District of Nigeria's capital city of Abuja. At , it is the tallest artificial structure in Abuja. The tower was designed by Manfredi Nicoletti and is part of the Nigeria National Complex which also includes the Nigerian Cultural Centre, an eight-storey, low rise, pyramid shaped Cultural Centre. Construction for the tower started in 2006 and was topped out in 2014 whilst the cultural centre is still under construction.

The site is severed by a main road, so the two structures will be linked via an underground arcade. The tower consists of three cylindrical concrete pillar-like structures varying in height and linked together near the tower's first peak using a disc-shaped section that is intended to house in its two floors an observation deck and a viewing restaurant. Around the pillars of the tower, three transparent stainless steel wings wrap around the base of the tower and gradually open outwards in a fan-like fashion as they extend up the height of the tower.

See also
 List of towers

References

External links
 Manfredi Nicoletti Abuja National Complex project
 
 Construction photo on Immaginionline.net

Buildings and structures under construction in Nigeria
Neo-futurism architecture
Buildings and structures in Abuja